Kyiv in Miniature is a park of miniatures, situated in Kyiv in the area of Hydropark. There are exposed models of Kyiv architectural sightseeings, in the scale of 1:33. It was opened on 23 June 2006, the closest metro station to it is Hydropark.

Miniatures 
There are 48 miniatures in the park, including Independence Square and Khreschatyk, Kyiv Pechersk Lavra, St. Michael's Golden-Domed Monastery, Golden Gates, Saint Sophia Cathedral, Mother Motherland Monument, Kyiv Passenger Railway Station, Boryspil Airport and others.

Gallery

External links

Tourist attractions in Kyiv
Miniature parks
Parks in Kyiv